Mariano Comense railway station is a railway station in Italy. Located on the Milan–Asso railway, it serves the town of Mariano Comense.

Services
Mariano Comense is terminus of the line S2 of the Milan suburban railway network, and served as well by the regional trains Milan–Asso. All this trains are operated by the lombard railway company Trenord.

See also
Milan suburban railway network

External links
 Ferrovienord official site - Mariano Comense railway station 

Railway stations in Lombardy
Ferrovienord stations
Railway stations opened in 1879
Milan S Lines stations